An independence referendum was held in Nagorno-Karabakh on 10 December 1991. It was approved by 99.98% of voters.  

The referendum was conducted according to the "Temporary Regulation on the Conduct of a Referendum in the Nagorno Karabakh Republic" that came into force on 27 November 1991 during the session of the Nagorno Karabakh Council of People's Deputies. Trilingual ballot papers (in Armenian, Azerbaijani and Russian) were sent to all parts of Nagorno Karabakh, including the Azerbaijani-populated settlements, with a question: "Do you agree that the proclaimed Nagorno Karabakh Republic be a sovereign state, to independently determine the forms of cooperation with other states and communities?". It would be considered a pass if at least the two-third of voters with a turnout of at least 50% voted for it. From 132,328 citizens eligible to vote, 108,736 citizens or 82,2% of the registered voters took part in the referendum, with 108,615 people (99,89%) voting "for" the independence, 24 (0,02%) voting "no" and 97 ballot papers considered invalid. The referendum was boycotted by the region's Azerbaijani population, which then constituted 20% of the entire population. A group of independent observers following the course of the referendum presented their conclusion in the act on the results of the referendum. The voting process was covered by reporters from Russia and France, and a number of other periodicals and agencies, as well as TV channels of Russia, the United States and Bulgaria. On the day of the referendum,  Stepanakert, and other Armenian settlements, came under fire with 10 civilian deaths 11 wounded reported.

Neither the 1991 referendum nor the one that followed in 2006 were recognised as legitimate abroad. Nagorno-Karabakh continued to be internationally considered as de jure part of Azerbaijan.

Results

See also
2006 Nagorno-Karabakh constitutional referendum

References

1991 in Azerbaijan
1991 in the Soviet Union
1991 in the Nagorno-Karabakh Republic
1991 referendums
Dissolution of the Soviet Union
Independence referendums
1991
Referendums in the Soviet Union
Nagorno-Karabakh Autonomous Oblast